Ellen Hamilton Campbell is an American politician who is the delegate for Virginia's 24th House of Delegates district. She began serving after winning a 2023 special election to replace her husband Ronnie R. Campbell, who died of cancer on December 13, 2022.

Political career
Ellen's husband, Ronnie R. Campbell, who represented the 24th district in the Virginia House of Delegates, died of cancer on December 13, 2022. Ellen ran in the special election to fill the seat for the remainder of her husband's term. She won the election, held January 10, 2023, against Democrat Jade D. Harris. She was sworn in on January 11, 2023.

Electoral history

References

Living people
Virginia Republicans
21st-century American politicians
21st-century American women politicians
Republican Party members of the Virginia House of Delegates
Year of birth missing (living people)